Nursery Rhyme Parade! is a 2015 studio album by American singer-songwriter Lisa Loeb.

Release and reception
This album continues a series of children's music recordings that Loeb has made, mixed in with music intended for adult audiences. Nursery Rhyme Parade! was produced by Amazon and accompanied by a 30-minute music video version shot in Hasting Studios for Amazon Prime. Loeb also promoted the release with live sing-along performances for families.

The album was reviewed by Nick Maslow of People, who called it a collection that children "are sure to love" for Loeb's "new spin" on the familiar songs.

Track listing
All songs are traditional compositions
"ABC" (a cappella) – 0:23
"Jack and Jill" – 1:16
"The Muffin Man" – 0:42
"This Old Man Intro (Declan)" – 0:10
"This Old Man" – 1:58
"It's Raining, It's Pouring" – 0:10
"Itsy Bitsy Spider" – 0:51
"Little Bo Peep" – 0:41
"London Bridge" – 1:32
"This Little Piggy" – 0:16
"Oh Where, Oh Where Has My Little Dog Gone?" – 0:42
"Sing a Song of Sixpence" – 0:41
"Row, Row, Row Your Boat" – 0:30
"Skip to My Lou" – 1:44
"Pop! Goes the Weasel" – 0:54
"Peter Piper" – 0:21
"Mary Had a Little Lamb" – 1:02
"Here We Go Round the Mulberry Bush" – 1:39
"Humpty Dumpty" – 0:40
"The Farmer in the Dell" – 1:50
"I Had a Little Nut Tree" – 1:04
"Baa, Baa Black Sheep" – 0:34
"Ring Around the Rosie" – 0:19
"Three Little Kittens" – 1:50
"Mary, Mary, Quite Contrary" – 0:38
"Hey Diddle Diddle" – 0:39
"Hickory Dickory Dock" – 0:25
"A-Tisket A-Tasket" – 0:51
"Pease Porridge Hot" – 0:44
"There Was a Crooked Man" – 0:14
"Diddle Diddle Dumpling" – 0:43
"Yankee Doodle" – 0:39
"Star Light, Star Bright (Lyla)" – 0:23
"Twinkle, Twinkle Little Star" – 1:06
"Hush, Little Baby" – 1:08
"Little Boy Blue" – 1:16
"ABC" – 1:00

Personnel
Lisa Loeb – guitar, vocals
Rich Jacques – production
Luke Joerger – direction and production for video release
Renee Stahl – vocals
Ekaterina Trukhan – cover art

See also
List of 2015 albums

References

External links

Review from Celebrity Parents Magazine

2015 albums
Lisa Loeb albums
Children's music albums by American artists
Nursery rhymes albums
Covers albums